Advanced Composites Solutions, commonly shortened to ACS is an engineering company specialized in composite materials technology, mainly their application to the development and construction of light aircraft.

History
Founded by professionals with vast accumulated experience in the international aeronautic industry, the company is located in the city of São José dos Campos in the Brazilian aeronautic cluster. Besides engineering services the main current activity of ACS is the production of the ACS-100 Sora, a two-seat light sport aircraft

ACS is also involved in the development and integration of Unmanned Aircraft Systems through its subsidiary flight Solutions.

Aircraft

References

External links
 Company website

Aircraft manufacturers of Brazil
Defence companies of Brazil
Companies based in São Paulo (state)
Brazilian brands